Neville Anthony Mascarenhas (10 July 1928 – 3 December 1986) was a Pakistani journalist and author. His works include exposés on the brutality of Pakistan's military during the 1971 independence movement of Bangladesh, The Rape of Bangla Desh (1971) and Bangladesh: A Legacy of Blood (1986).

Personal life
Mascarenhas was born into a Goan Catholic family in Belgaum (then part of the Bombay Presidency, just over 100 kilometres away from Portuguese-ruled Goa, and educated in Karachi. He and his wife Yvonne Mascarenhas together had five children. He died in 1986.

Career
Mascarenhas was a journalist who was the assistant editor at The Morning News (Karachi). After collecting information on the atrocities committed in Bangladesh, he realised he could not publish the story in Pakistan and contacted Harold Evans of The Sunday Times. Before the publication of his report in 1971, he moved his family to Britain. Thereafter, he worked for 14 years with The Sunday Times. Afterwards, he was a freelance writer.

In 1972, he was awarded the Granada's Gerald Barry Award for lifetime achievement in journalism (ceremony on What The Papers Say), as well as the International Publishing Company's Special Award for reporting on the human rights violations committed during the Bangladesh Liberation War. His article "Genocide" in The Sunday Times on 13 June 1971 is credited with having "exposed for the first time the scale of the Pakistan army's brutal campaign to suppress its breakaway eastern province".

The BBC writes: "There is little doubt that Mascarenhas' reportage played its part in ending the war. It helped turn world opinion against Pakistan and encouraged India to play a decisive role." Indian Prime Minister Indira Gandhi stating that Mascarenhas' article led her "to prepare the ground for India's armed intervention".

The Bangladeshi government honoured Mascarenhas's contribution to the nation during the 1971 liberation war by preparing an official list of names.

Works

References

1928 births
1986 deaths
People of the Bangladesh Liberation War
British Asian writers
Goan Catholics
Pakistani dissidents
Pakistani emigrants to the United Kingdom
Pakistani male journalists
Pakistani people of Goan descent
British people of Goan descent
Pakistani whistleblowers